Granofilosea is a class of cercozoan protists in the subphylum Reticulofilosa. Out of the three groups that were traditionally considered heliozoans: the heliomonads, gymnosphaerids and desmothoracids, the latter were recently grouped into this new class.

Phylogeny and taxonomy

Phylogeny
The following cladogram shows the results of a 2011 phylogenetic analysis:

Taxonomy
 Class Granofilosea Cavalier-Smith & Bass 2009
 Family ?Microgromiidae De Saedeleer 1934
 Genus Apogromia de Saedeleer 1934
 Genus Belaria de Saedeleer 1934
 Genus Heterogromia de Saedeleer 1934
 Genus Microgromia Hertwig & Lesser 1874
 Genus Paralieberkuehnia de Saedeleer 1934
 Order ?Axomonadida [Exonucleoaxoplastiales]
 Family Tetradimorphidae Febvre-Chevalier & Febvre 1984
 Genus Tetradimorpha Hsiung 1927
 Order Desmothoracida Honigberg et al. 1964 [Cryptaxohelida; Desmothoraca Hertwig & Lesser 1874; Clathrulinida Starobogatov 1980]
 Family Clathrulinidae Claus 1874
 Genus Actinosphaeridium Zacharias 1893
 Genus Cienkowskya Schaudinn 1896 non Regel & Rach 1859 non Solms 1867
 Genus Clathrulina Cienkowski 1867
 Genus Elaeorhanis Greeff 1873
 Genus Hedriocystis Hertwig & Lesser 1874
 Genus Penardiophrys Mikrjukov 2000
 Order Cryptofilida Cavalier-Smith & Bass 2009
 Family Mesofilidae Cavalier-Smith & Bass 2009
 Genus Mesofila Cavalier-Smith & Bass 2009
 Family Nanofilidae Cavalier-Smith & Bass 2009
 Genus Nanofila Bass et al. 2009
 Order Limnofilida Cavalier-Smith & Bass 2009
 Family Limnofilidae Cavalier-Smith & Bass 2009
 Genus Limnofila Cavalier-Smith & Bass 2009
 Order Leucodictyida Cavalier-Smith 1993 emend. 2003
 Family Massisteriidae Cavalier-Smith 1993
 Genus Massisteria Larsen & Patterson 1990
 Genus Minimassisteria Arndt & Cavalier-Smith 2011
 Family Leucodictyidae Cavalier-Smith 1993 [Reticulamoebidae]
 Genus Leucodictyon Grell 1991
 Genus Reticulamoeba Grell 1994
 Genus Thalassomyxa Grell 1985

References

External links
 

 
Cercozoa classes
Taxa named by Thomas Cavalier-Smith